The Beehive Social Democratic Party is a Cambodian political party founded in 2015 by Beehive Radio journalist Mam Sonando. The party came in seventh of twenty political parties in the 2018 general election.

Recent electoral history

References

2015 establishments in Cambodia
Political parties established in 2015
Political parties in Cambodia
Social democratic parties in Cambodia